Hyouka is a 22-episode animated television series based on Honobu Yonezawa's novel of the same name. It was produced by Kyoto Animation with direction by Yasuhiro Takemoto, series composition by Shoji Gatoh, character design by Futoshi Nishiya,  and music composition by Kohei Tanaka. The series centers around the events which first-year high school student Houtarou Oreki faces when he joins his school's Classic Literature Club.

Hyouka aired in Japan from April to September, 2012. The series was broadcast on Tokyo MX, Chiba TV, Television Saitama, Television Kanagawa, KBS Kyoto, Sun Television, Gifu Broadcasting System, Mie Television, TVQ Kyushu Broadcasting, and BS11. The first episode premiered on April 14 at a special event at Kadowaka Cinema, Shinjuku. A bonus original video animation episode was streamed online on UStream on July 8, 2012, and was later released on Blu-ray Disc with the third manga volume on January 13, 2013. Two Drama CD volumes were released by Bandai Namco Arts in August and October of 2012. Kadokawa Shoten released the Blu-ray/DVD volumes of Hyouka in Japan. 

Funimation licensed the anime and released a two-part Blu-ray/DVD edition in North America in July and September of 2017 with an English dub. Following Sony's acquisition of Funimation, the series was moved to Crunchyroll. Anime Limited released it in the United Kingdom in 2017 and 2018. In November 2021, Funimation UK relicensed the anime and released a complete series edition containing all the episodes.

The series has four pieces of theme music: two opening themes and two ending themes.

Episodes

OVA

Drama CD 
Two Drama CD volumes were released by Bandai Namco Arts. The first volume was released on August 22, 2012, and the second volume was released on October 10, 2012.

Volume 1

Volume 2

Home video releases

Japanese-language releases

English-language releases

References 

Hyouka